Vasek Pospisil was the defending champion but lost in the final to Matthew Ebden.

Ebden won the title after defeating Pospisil 7–6(7–4), 6–1 in the final.

Seeds

Draw

Finals

Top half

Bottom half

References
Main Draw
Qualifying Draw

Busan Open - Singles
2018 Singles